The 1988 United States Senate election in Michigan was held on November 8, 1988. Incumbent Democratic U.S. Senator Don Riegle won re-election to a third term. Despite George H. W. Bush’s landslide victory in Michigan and the rest of the country, Riegle’s margin of victory increased from the previous one.

General election

Candidates
 Sally Bier (Workers Against Concessions)
 James Whitney Dunn, former U.S. Congressman (1981–83) (Republican)
 Mark Friedman (Independent)
 Dick Jacobs (Libertarian)
 Don Riegle, incumbent U.S. Senator since 1976 (Democratic)

Results

See also 
 1988 United States Senate elections

References 

1988
Michigan
1988 Michigan elections